Ya Nass is the debut solo album by the Lebanese singer Yasmine Hamdan, previously a member of the band Soap Kills and one half of the duo Y.A.S. The album was originally given a limited release, in France and Lebanon, on the French Kwaidan label in 2012, under the title Yasmine Hamdan. It was released internationally by Crammed Discs in April 2013, under the title Ya Nass, featuring five new songs. It was produced by Marc Collin, best known for his new wave covers project Nouvelle Vague.

Overview
The album's title translates from Arabic as "Hey People". Hamdan has described the album as being influenced by the Arab Spring uprisings of 2010, "Ya Nass is a like an invitation, a call to a single person or a crowd ... It could be an echo of the movements that are taking place in the Arab world." She added, "At first when the revolutions started I felt very stimulated and free, I felt that the youth had at last begun to have a voice. But I also know that these things take time and that the situation in the region is complicated."

The album features a mixture of original compositions and reworkings of older songs from the 1930s and 1940s, including songs by the Egyptian composer Mohammed Abdel Wahab and the singer Leila Mourad. It also includes the song "Hal", which Hamdan performs in the vampire film Only Lovers Left Alive (2013), directed by Jim Jarmusch. Hamdan wrote the song for the film; the lyrics concern a woman who complains about "a vampirising love affair".

Critical reception

The album received generally positive reviews. The Guardian wrote, "She has a sultry, seductive voice and gift for melody that is reminiscent of Souad Massi, and her best songs rely on acoustic guitar rather than the swirling synths." NPR's reviewer described Hamdan as "one of the most free-thinking and inventive artists singing in Arabic today," and said of the album that it "is full of ... subtle references to the past, but you don't need to understand them to appreciate the songs."

Track listing

Yasmine Hamdan
Original track listing on the Kwaidan release:

In Kan Fouadi
Beirut
Samar
Baaden
Ya Nass
Irss
Nediya
Nag
Shouei
La Mouch
Bala Tantanat
Zarani [Pre-Order Only]
Khalas [Pre-Order Only]

Ya Nass
Track listing on the Crammed Discs release:

Deny
Shouei
Samar
Enta Fen, Again
La Mouch
Nediya
Beirut
Aleb
Bala Tantanat
In Kan Fouadi
Hal
Khayyam
Ya Nass
Khalas (iTunes only)
Zarani (iTunes only)

References

2013 albums
Yasmine Hamdan albums
Arabic-language albums